Richard Furlong Mitchell (October 11, 1889 – August 2, 1969) was the chief justice of the Iowa Supreme Court from December 6, 1932, to December 31, 1942, appointed from Webster County, Iowa.

Born in Fort Dodge, Iowa, he was the son of Sarah A. (Furlong) and Peter M. Mitchell. His grandson is comedian and actor Jim Gaffigan.

In 1946, President Harry S. Truman appointed Mitchell to the Interstate Commerce Commission. In the 1944 Iowa gubernatorial election, Mitchell was the Democratic nominee for governor of Iowa.

Mitchell died at his home in Chevy Chase, Maryland, at the age of 79.

References

External links

1889 births
1969 deaths
People from Fort Dodge, Iowa
Justices of the Iowa Supreme Court
20th-century American judges
People of the Interstate Commerce Commission